Erica Hubbard is an American actress and model. Hubbard is best known for her roles as Kiana Anderson in the 2006 film Akeelah and the Bee, Cassandra "Cassie" Sutton on the ABC Family series Lincoln Heights (2007-09) and Kita Whitmore on Let's Stay Together (2011-14) on the BET network. She is also the voice of Abbey for the TV series The Replacements. She created "The Erica Hubbard Foundation" to help youth in at-risk communities.

Life and career
Hubbard attended Columbia College in Chicago where she majored in Broadcast Journalism and minored in Theater and earned her Bachelor of Arts degree in three years. The show aired on WPWR, a UPN affiliate in Chicago. By the time the third season had started airing, she had already won a Regional Emmy award for hosting the show and earned a Service To America Award from the National Association of Broadcasters. She began acting since the age of nine in commercials for McDonald's, Reebok, Sears, Kellogg's, MCI, and others.

Hubbard also appeared in magazine ads for Noxzema in 1997. She has appeared in the films Simon Says, Akeelah and the Bee, The Sisterhood of the Traveling Pants, Save the Last Dance, A Cinderella Story, as well as numerous television series including Lincoln Heights, CSI: Miami, and Everybody Hates Chris.

Filmography

Film

Television

References

External links
 
 Erica Hubbard Interview

Actresses from Chicago
Living people
African-American actresses
American television actresses
American film actresses
20th-century American actresses
21st-century American actresses
Female models from Illinois
African-American female models
African-American models
Columbia College Chicago alumni
20th-century African-American women
20th-century African-American people
21st-century African-American women
21st-century African-American people
Year of birth missing (living people)